Maria Hinze is a German visual artist with the main focus in painting and drawing. Born in Germany, she studied in Vienna at the Academy of Fine Arts under Walter Obholzer, in Leipzig at the Academy of Fine Arts in the class of Neo Rauch and Astrid Klein and in Düsseldorf in the class of Tal R. She has produced multimedia works and exhibited together with the light technicians Hans Leser (HAU) and Martin Schwemin (Rimini Protokoll) at Souterrain-Berlin, with filmmaker Johann Lurf and painter Florian Schmidt and other artists in the Pinacoteca Vienna. She has worked on interdisciplinary projects with Raymond Pettibon (for the art book "Dem neuen Himmel eine neue Erde"), Simon Faithfull, Taka Kagitomi and Camilla Richter and musicians such as Etkin Cekin (Istanbul), Mike Moya (Montreal) and M. Rux (Berlin).

Life and career 
Hinze's artistic approach touches on contemporary and historical discourses about art and architecture, which she transfers into new formats, such as at the Archiv Massiv in Leipzig, at Acud Macht Neu and Plattenpalast in Berlin, the BMW branch at Alte Messe in Leipzig or at Haus Blumenthal, Händelallee 67 in Berlin's Hansaviertel district.

She currently lives and works in Berlin (Germany) and Montreal (Canada) with her partner musician Mike Moya (Godspeed You! Black Emperor) and their family.

Education 
2009–2010 Studied painting, Düsseldorf Art Academy, Prof. Tal R

2005–2008 Studied painting and graphic design, Academy of Fine Arts Leipzig, Prof. Neo Rauch – Degree in Fine Art

2004–2005 Studied art, Academy of Fine Arts Leipzig, Prof. Astrid Klein

2002–2004 Studied art, Academy of Fine Arts Vienna, Prof. Walter Obholzer

2000–2002 Studied art history, Humboldt University Berlin

Work 
In her work, Hinze tackles the complexity of varying methods and approaches in order to question pictorial spaces and visual content. She is interested in finding independent structural and aesthetic means, via which her work can challenge the power of drawing and painting to influence the observer, the materiality of the line in contrast to the pictorial surface and the possible multidimensionality of both media. The transition between media influences the very core of her work. She examines the potential meaning of drawing and painting in the liminal zones between the drawn line and the painted surface in tangible surroundings, as she does between an artistic mind-set and a sphere of social activity. Thematically, her work deals with concepts such as presence and permeability, visibility and invisibility, and disappearance, all from the most variant perspectives. These aspects are examined as moments of motion, as moments of appearance and acts of concealment. Maria Hinze's work is concerned with the relationship between humans and their surroundings. The human body functions as a physical medium for storing both the conscious and subconscious. Hinze comprehends herself as a storage medium for images of a world of language and form, which is rooted in the subconscious and, as such, precedes her own thought structures – intangible knowledge is translated into language and tangible space. 
Translated by Pete Littlewood.

Exhibitions

Solo exhibitions 

 2020 „Neues Leben, neue Zeit“ wall drawing, Haus Blumenthal, Hansaviertel Berlin
2016/17 "The sagest time to dam the sea is when the sea is gone", in dialogue with works by Camilla Richter, Florian Schmidt, Simon Faithfull, Taka Kagitomi at KVlegal, Berlin
 2016 "Totgesagte leben länger", former Tuberculosis clinic Vogelsang near Gommern, department for pain therapy
 2016 "Line Out Somewhere, Part II", Beach drawing with Mike Moya (Godspeed You! Black Emperor), Darßer peninsula near Ahrensoop
 2014 "Notiz 14" with Etkin Çekin (Farfara), Mike Moya (Godspeed You! Black Emperor), Saaela Abrams, project space Acud, Berlin
 2014 "Line Out Somewhere", beach drawing with Mike Moya (Godspeed You! Black Emperor), Darß peninsula near Ahrenshoop
 2014 "The Great", private site "LEUCHTKRAFT" – lighting, camera,  production, Berlin
 2013 "Federding", at Mike Moya's, Montreal
 2013 "Zeichenfinder", private collection, Prof. Carsten Wieworra,  Plattenpalast, Berlin
 2012 "Zwischen Utopie und Wirklichkeit", Haus Blumenthal, Hansaviertel, private collection, Händelallee 67, Berlin
 2012 "Ordnung, Kraft", Meinblau e.V., Berlin
 2011 "Broken Circle", with Falko Teichmann, Hans Leser, M. Rux, Souterrain-Berlin
 2010 "The Mess We Made", Archiv Massiv, Baumwollspinnerei, Leipzig
 2010 "When An Area Is Enveloped By Fog It Appears Larger More Sublime", with M. Rux/Ellenschneider, Lukas Lonski, Kiki Bohemia and Chez Mieke, Wald und Wiese alias Fog Puma, bar25, Berlin
 2009 "Both Sides Of A Swing Door Are Swaying Open And Shut, As If Blown By A Breath Of Wind Or The After-effects Of Someone Passing Through", Plattenpalast, Berlin
 2009 "He Persists in Silence", Enblanco project space, Berlin
 2008 "Dem neuen Himmel eine neue Erde", Diplom Galerie Pierogie, Leipzig/Brooklyn

Selected group exhibitions and projects 
2020 “Herzschwingen - Tension of Human Life – The Heartbeat and Myocardial Contraction“, curated by Maria Hinze, with Kimberley de Jong and Jason Sharp, Laura Fong Prosper, Nele Brönner, Aidan Girt, Gambletron, Mike Moya, Kevin Doria, Nick Kuepfer and others; Meinblau e.V. Projektraum, Pfefferberg, Berlin
2018 "Tokyo Morandi" curated by Maria Hinze with Sophie Trudeau, Michaela Grill, Karl Holmquist,  Camilla Richter, Mauro Pezzente, Kimberley de Jong, Mike Moya, Simon Faithfull, Philippe Leonard, Johann Lurf, Gambletron and Johnny Nawracaj at Meinblau Projektraum, Pfefferberg, Berlin
2016 48 Stunden Neuköln, Cherie Sundays No 7 // nothing happens, with Laura Fong Prosper i.a., Berlin
 2015 "Display", with Ayumi Rahn, Christian Otto, Johann Lurf,  Karl Lemieux, Michael Part, Walter Obholzer, Pinacoteca Wien, Vienna
 2014 "Neue Regeln", with Peder K. Bugge, Takehito Koganezawa, Arne Schreiber, curated by Anne Fäser, Isabel Holert, Felix Laubscher,  Plattenpalast, Berlin
 2014 "Paradis de la Crème", with Falko Teichmann, M. Rux, Talis and Gatis Silde, Naked Lunch, Berlin
 2013 "Let it go", with Fiete Stolte, Kerstin Gottschalk, Melissa Steckbauer, Rainer Neumeier a.o., Souterrain-Berlin
 2013 "Radio Osscillations", curated residency, with Gambletron and  Jen Reimer, Montreal, Souterrain-Berlin
 2013 "Transitory Rituals", curated exhibition, with Hanako Geierhos,  Souterrain-Berlin
 2013 fashion collection, "Fernzeichen" mit Lesole, Berlin
 2012 participation in group exhibition "Timed Up and Go Test", with Florian Schmidt, Kartenrecht, Kitty Kraus, Ulf Aminde a.o., Souterrain-Berlin
 2012 participation in group exhibition "Let it Flow let it Go", with Christian Egger, Dominique Hurth, Thomas Janitzky a.o., Souterrain-Berlin
 2012 participation in group exhibition "Temporary Home", video performance, parallel event to Documenta, Kassel
 2011 "Er hockte in der Zeit und konnte sie nicht an sich bringen", with Alexandra Leykauf, Eiko Grimberg, Michael Part, Norbert Witzgall a.o.,  Auguststr. 35, Berlin
 2011 participation in group exhibition, "Heavy Papers", Galeri Merkur, Istanbul
 2011 participation in group exhibition, "Offensichtlich öffentlich", curated by Peer Golo Willi, Berlin
 2010 participation in group exhibition, Canakkale Biennale,  "Fiktional, Realities, Transformations", Canakkale
 2010 studio presentations, Akademie der Künste, Düsseldorf, class Tal R
 2009 work presentation, Baumwollspinnerei, Leipzig
 2009 Lubok, Museum of Fine Arts, Leipzig
 2008 book project "Dem neuen Himmel eine neue Erde", with Raymond Pettibon, limited edition
 2008 group exhibition of the final year class, HGB Leipzig
 2007 ALS-Immendorf-Initiative of Charite Hospital Berlin, class Immendorf (Düsseldorf), class Rauch (Leipzig), class Richter (Berlin)
 2007 Lubok 3, with Cindy Schmiedichen, Matthias Weischer,  David Schnell a.o.
 2005 mural, "o.T.", BMW branch office Leipzig, Alte Messe,  in association with HGB Leipzig
 2005 "TEST, TEST, TEST", Art-Atom,  project space Schleifmühlengasse, Vienna
 2004 Klasse Walter Obholzer, Galerie 422, Gmunden

Album cover artworks 
 2014 "Spree", Air Cushion Finish, Hamburg
 2011 "111", ellenschneider, Rostock
 2007 "Walls", Apparat, Berlin

Funding and grants 
 2015 long list, Art Aesthetica Art Prize
 2009-2010 funding from the European Social Fund
 2006 travel grant to Los Angeles and San Francisco, Friedrich-Ebert-Stiftung
 2004-2008 grant by the Friedrich-Ebert-Stiftung, funding for the main course Fine Arts

References

External links 
 Maria Hinze official website
 Souterrain-Berlin official website 
 PLATTENPALAST official website
 Acud Macht Neu official website
KVLegal official website

German artists
1981 births
Living people